The International Film Music Critics Association Award for Best New Archival Release of an Existing Score – Re-Release or Re-Recording is an annual award given by the International Film Music Critics Association, or the IFMCA. The award is given to the composer(s) of a score's re-release and/or re-recording deemed to be the best in a given year. Recipients of the award also include conductors, album producers, album artwork artists and liner note writers. The award was first given in 1998, and separated into two categories; one for re-releases, and another for re-recordings (it was awarded separately again in 2009, 2012 and 2013). It has been awarded every year since 2008.

Winners and nominations

1990s

2000s

2010s

References

International Film Music Critics Association Awards